The Cheyenne Metropolitan Statistical Area is a United States Census Bureau defined Metropolitan Statistical Area (MSA) located in the Cheyenne region of the State of Wyoming.  The Cheyenne Metropolitan Statistical Area is defined as Laramie County, Wyoming. Many consider the Cheyenne Metro Area to be the economic hub of eastern Wyoming. The Census Bureau estimates that the population was 99,500 in 2019, ranking as the 288th most populous metropolitan area in the United States.

The Cheyenne Metropolitan Statistical Area includes the City of Cheyenne, the Town of Albin, the Town of Burns, the Town of Pine Bluffs and the unincorporated areas of Laramie County.

Communities

Places with more than 10,000 inhabitants 
 Cheyenne (Principal City)

Places with 1,000 to 10,000 inhabitants 
 Ranchettes
 South Greeley
 Fox Farm-College
 Warren AFB
 Pine Bluffs

Places with fewer than 1,000 inhabitants 
 Burns
 Albin
 Carpenter (census designated-place)
 Hillsdale

See also

Laramie County, Wyoming
Wyoming census statistical areas
Wyoming metropolitan areas
Combined Statistical Area
Core Based Statistical Area
Metropolitan Statistical Area
Micropolitan Statistical Area
Table of United States Combined Statistical Areas
Table of United States Metropolitan Statistical Areas
Table of United States Micropolitan Statistical Areas
Table of United States primary census statistical areas
Larger urban regions that contain the Cheyenne Metropolitan Statistical Area:
Front Range Urban Corridor
Core Based Statistical Areas adjacent to Cheyenne Metropolitan Statistical Area:
Laramie Micropolitan Statistical Area
Greeley Metropolitan Statistical Area (Colorado)

References

Metropolitan areas of Wyoming